Antoine Caldwell (born April 19, 1986) is a former American football center and guard. He played college football for the University of Alabama, and earned All-American honors.  He was drafted by the Houston Texans in the third round of the 2009 NFL Draft.

He also played for the Buffalo Bills and Jacksonville Jaguars.

Early years
Caldwell was born in Montgomery, Alabama.  He attended Robert E. Lee High School in Montgomery, where he was a standout lineman for his high school football team. Considered a three-star recruit by Rivals.com, Caldwell was listed as the No. 10 center prospect of his class.

College career
Caldwell received an athletic scholarship to attend the University of Alabama, where he played for coach Mike Shula and coach Nick Saban's Alabama Crimson Tide football teams from 2005 to 2008.  As a senior in 2008, he was recognized as a first-team All-Southeastern Conference (SEC) selection and a consensus first-team All-American.

Awards and honors
2005 Freshman first-team All-SEC (as selected by the league's coaches, who are not allowed to vote for their own players, and the Sporting News)
2005 Sporting News freshman All-American
2005 Rivals.com first-team freshman All-American
2006 Second-team All-SEC (Coaches)
2006, 2007, 2008 Rimington Trophy watchlist
2008 Rivals.com All-SEC second-team
2008 All-SEC first-team (Coaches)
2008 consensus first-team All-American (earned consensus status after being selected by the Associated Press, American Football Coaches Association, and Sporting News)

Professional career

2009 NFL Draft
Caldwell was graded as the No. 3 center available in the 2009 NFL Draft, behind Alex Mack and Eric Wood. As projected, he was the third center selected off the board, in the third round by the Houston Texans.

Houston Texans
From 2009 to 2012, Caldwell played 39 games, including 19 starts, for the Texans.

Buffalo Bills
Caldwell signed with the Buffalo Bills on July 28, 2013. He was released on August 30, 2013.

Jacksonville Jaguars
In May 2014, Caldwell went to Jaguars Rookie Mini-Camp on a tryout basis. He was not offered on contract. However, he was signed to the active roster on August 13, 2014. The Jaguars released Caldwell on August 24, 2014.

References

External links
 Houston Texans biography
 Alabama Crimson Tide biography

1986 births
Living people
University of Alabama alumni
Alabama Crimson Tide football players
All-American college football players
American football centers
American football offensive guards
Houston Texans players
Buffalo Bills players
Jacksonville Jaguars players
Players of American football from Montgomery, Alabama
People from Tallassee, Alabama